The 2017 Women's National Invitation Tournament was an annual single-elimination tournament of 64 NCAA Division I teams that were not selected to participate in the 2017 Women's NCAA tournament. The tournament committee announced the 64-team field on March 13, following the selection of the NCAA Tournament field. The tournament began on March 15 and ended on April 1, with the championship game televised on the CBS Sports Network. In the championship game, the Michigan Wolverines defeated the Georgia Tech Yellow Jackets, 89–79, in triple overtime.

Participants
The 2017 Postseason WNIT field consists of 32 automatic invitations – one from each conference – and 32 (or more) at-large teams. The intention of the WNIT Selection Committee was to select the best available at-large teams in the nation. A team offered an automatic berth by the WNIT will be the team that is the highest-finishing team in its conference's regular-season standings, and not selected for the NCAA Tournament. A team that fulfills these qualities, and accepts, earned the WNIT automatic berth for its conference, regardless of overall record. The remaining berths in the WNIT were filled by the best teams available. Any team considered for an at-large berth has an overall record of .500 or better.

Automatic qualifiers

At-large bids

Bracket
All times are listed as Eastern Daylight Time (UTC−4)
* – Denotes overtime period

Semifinals and Championship Game

All-tournament team
 Katelynn Flaherty, Michigan (MVP)
 Alex Louin, Villanova
 Zaire O'Neil, Georgia Tech
 Francesca Pan, Georgia Tech
 Alexys Swedlund, Washington State
 Hallie Thome, Michigan
Source:

See also
 2017 Women's Basketball Invitational

References

Women's National Invitation Tournament
Women's National Invitation Tournament
Women's National Invitation Tournament
Women's National Invitation Tournament
Women's National Invitation Tournament